The men's cross-country is an event at the annual UCI Mountain Bike & Trials World Championships. It has been held since the inaugural world championships in 1990. As of September 2022, Nino Schurter of Switzerland is the most successful rider in the event with ten world titles.

Medalists

Medal table

Medal table by rider

References

Results from the Union Cycliste Internationale's website.

Events at the UCI Mountain Bike & Trials World Championships